Loyal Lives is a 1923 American silent drama film directed by Charles Giblyn and starring Brandon Tynan, Mary Carr and Faire Binney.

Cast
 Brandon Tynan as Dan O'Brien 
 Mary Carr as Mary O'Brien 
 Faire Binney as Peggy 
 William Collier Jr. as Terrence 
 Charles Mcdonald as Michael O'Hara 
 Blanche Craig as Lizzie O'Hara 
 Chester Morris as Tom O'Hara 
 Tom Blake as Brady 
 Blanche Davenport as Mrs. Brady 
 Jack Hopkins as Judkins 
 Mickey Bennett as Terrence, as a child

References

Bibliography
 Munden, Kenneth White. The American Film Institute Catalog of Motion Pictures Produced in the United States, Part 1. University of California Press, 1997.

External links

1923 films
1923 drama films
Silent American drama films
Films directed by Charles Giblyn
American silent feature films
1920s English-language films
American black-and-white films
Vitagraph Studios films
1920s American films